Zhang Xi (born December 1965) is a Chinese chemist and the current president of Jilin University. He is a chemist and a member of the Chinese Academy of Sciences.

Early life
Zhang was born in Benxi, Liaoning in 1986, he received his bachelor's degree in Chemistry from Jilin University. He then received his masters and Ph.D. degrees in Chemistry from the same university in 1989 and 1992 respectively.

Career
Zhang became a lecturer at Jilin University from 1993 to 1994. From 1994 to 2003, he became a professor of Chemistry at the same university. Since 2003, he has been a professor of chemistry at Tsinghua University in Beijing, China. He then became associate dean of the Faculty of Science at the university. In 2018, he became the President of Jilin University.

Awards
Zhang was elected a member of the Chinese Academy of Sciences in 2007. He was awarded "Fellow" of the University of Tokyo in 2013.

References

1965 births
Living people
Jilin University alumni
Chinese educators
Academic staff of Tsinghua University
Chemists from Liaoning
Members of the Chinese Academy of Sciences